is a female Japanese former volleyball player who competed in the 1968 Summer Olympics.

She was born in Osaka Prefecture.

In 1968, she was part of the Japanese team which won the silver medal in the Olympic tournament. She played all seven matches.

External links
 
 

1946 births
Living people
Japanese women's volleyball players
Olympic volleyball players of Japan
Volleyball players at the 1968 Summer Olympics
Olympic silver medalists for Japan
Olympic medalists in volleyball
Medalists at the 1968 Summer Olympics
20th-century Japanese women